The discography of the South Korean boy group NCT consists of three studio albums and thirteen singles. The multi-national and unlimited boy group was formed and managed by the Korean entertainment company SM Entertainment in 2016. This page compiles the discography of NCT as a whole group. NCT had their first major release with NCT 2018 Empathy in 2018, featuring a total of eighteen members at the time under the name NCT 2018, marking the first singular-year project to involve all current members and sub-units of NCT. It was also the first NCT release to receive a platinum KMCA certificate following its introduction in the same year. They have subsequently released two more studio albums.

Albums

Studio albums

Singles

Promotional singles

Soundtrack appearances

Collaborations

Other charted songs

Notes

See also
NCT 127 discography
NCT Dream discography
WayV discography

References

External links
 

Discography
Discographies of South Korean artists
K-pop music group discographies